Madhusudan Kela is an Indian businessman and investor from Kurud, Chhattisgarh. He was chief investment strategist at Reliance Capital until 2017. He is currently the promoter of MK Ventures and a member on Board of various companies.

He graduated in 1991 from K. J. Somaiya Institute of Management Studies and Research (SIMSR), Mumbai with a  Masters in Management Studies; Thereafter he did equity research at CIFCO and Sharekhan.
In 1994 he joined Motilal Oswal to start its institutional desk before moving to UBS in 1996. In 2001, he joined Reliance Mutual Fund.

Kela was awarded the Business Standard Equity Fund Manager of the Year (2004) by Manmohan Singh, the Prime Minister of India.

References

Businesspeople from Chhattisgarh
Living people
Rajasthani people
Year of birth missing (living people)

Indian investors